The 2020 United States Senate election in Tennessee was held on November 3, 2020, concurrently with other elections to the United States Senate. The 2020 U.S. presidential election and elections to the U.S. House of Representatives were also held, as well as the State Senate and State House elections. Incumbent Republican Senator Lamar Alexander announced that he would not run for re-election on December 17, 2018. The former United States Ambassador to Japan, Bill Hagerty won the open seat by a large margin defeating his Democratic opponent Marquita Bradshaw.

In the primary, President Donald Trump endorsed Hagerty. He ended up winning the Republican nomination, defeating orthopedic surgeon Manny Sethi and 13 others in the Republican primary. In the Democratic primary, environmental activist Marquita Bradshaw from Memphis defeated Robin Kimbrough Hayes, as well as 3 other candidates. Nine independent candidates also appeared on the general election ballot. 

Bill Hagerty outperformed Donald Trump by almost 4% during the general election. This was because he did better in suburban, exurban, and urban areas across Tennessee.

Republican primary

Candidates

Nominee
 Bill Hagerty, businessman, former United States Ambassador to Japan and former Commissioner of the Tennessee Department of Economic and Community Development

Eliminated in the primary
Cliff Adkins
Natisha Brooks
 Byron Bush, dentist
 Roy Dale Cope, small business owner and pharmacist
 Terry Dicus, attorney
 Tom Emerson, Jr., Tea Party candidate for the U.S. Senate in 2014
 George Flinn, Jr., former Shelby County commissioner, Nixon Administration Official, physician, engineer, businessman, and Republican candidate in Tennessee's 8th congressional district in 2016 and 2018
 Jon Henry, U.S. Marine Corps veteran
 Kent Morrell, business owner
 Glen Neal, Jr., retired public servant
 John Osborne, real estate agent and business owner
 Aaron Pettigrew, truck driver
 David Schuster, U.S. Navy veteran
Manny Sethi, orthopedic surgeon, director of the Vanderbilt Orthopedic Institute Center for Health Policy and founder and president of the non-profit Healthy Tennessee

Disqualified from the primary ballot
 Jim Elkins, Republican candidate for Tennessee's 3rd congressional district in 2020
 Johnny Presley, retired physician's assistant, hospital, and clinic owner, farmer

Withdrawn
 Clyde Benson, army veteran and Republican candidate for District 39 of the Tennessee House of Representatives in 2016
 Larry Crim
 Josh Gapp, physician (running for TN-01)
 Garrett "Lance" Nichols
 Stokes Nielson, music industry executive and guitarist for the Lost Trailers

Declined
 Lamar Alexander, incumbent U.S. Senator
Mae Beavers, former state senator (endorsed Sethi)
Diane Black, former U.S. Representative for Tennessee's 6th congressional district and candidate for Governor in 2018
Randy Boyd, former Commissioner of the Tennessee Department of Economic and Community Development, candidate for Governor in 2018, and President of the University of Tennessee system
Bob Corker, former U.S. Senator
Stephen Fincher, former U.S. Representative for Tennessee's 8th congressional district and candidate for U.S. Senate in 2018
 Chuck Fleischmann, U.S. Representative for Tennessee's 3rd congressional district
Mark E. Green, U.S. Representative for Tennessee's 7th congressional district and former state senator
Tre Hargett, Tennessee Secretary of State
Beth Harwell, former Speaker of the Tennessee House of Representatives and candidate for Governor in 2018
Bill Haslam, former Governor of Tennessee
David Kustoff, U.S. Representative for Tennessee's 8th congressional district and former U.S. Attorney
 Peyton Manning, retired NFL quarterback
 Jeff Webb, businessman (endorsed Sethi)

Endorsements

Polling

Results

Democratic primary

Candidates

Nominee
Marquita Bradshaw, environmentalist

Eliminated in the primary
Gary G. Davis, small business owner, baker, pilot, and perennial candidate
Robin Kimbrough Hayes, attorney and Christian minister
James Mackler, attorney, U.S. Army veteran and candidate for the U.S. Senate in 2018
Mark Pickrell, entrepreneur, attorney and Baptist deacon

Disqualified from the primary ballot
 Tharon Chandler, journalist, economist, and conservationist

Withdrawn
 Diana C. Onyejiaka, college professor and consultant

Declined
Andy Berke, incumbent mayor of Chattanooga and former state senator
Phil Bredesen, former mayor of Nashville and Governor of Tennessee and nominee for U.S. Senate in 2018 (endorsed James Mackler)
John Ray Clemmons, state representative and candidate for Mayor of Nashville in 2019
Karl Dean, former mayor of Nashville and nominee for Governor of Tennessee in 2018
Sara Kyle, incumbent state senator
Tim McGraw, singer-songwriter
Jason Powell, State Representative, real estate agent, non-profit manager
Madeline Rogero, former mayor of Knoxville
Renata Soto, executive director of Conexión Américas
Jeff Yarbro, minority leader of the Tennessee State Senate

Endorsements

Results

Independents

Declared
Yomi Faparusi, physician, attorney, researcher, and former Republican candidate for Tennessee's 4th congressional district in 2014 and 2016
Jeffrey Grunau, activist
Ronnie Henley,
Dean Hill, US veteran, former federal employee, and activist
Steven Hooper
Aaron James
Elizabeth McLeod, conservative activist
Eric William Stansberry

Withdrawn
Tom Kovach, attorney
Kacey Morgan, freelancer and operations director (endorsed Marquita Bradshaw) (remained on ballot)

General election

Predictions

Endorsements

Polling

with Bill Hagerty and James Mackler

with Manny Sethi and James Mackler

with Generic Republican and Generic Democrat

Results

See also
 Elections in Tennessee
 Political party strength in Tennessee
 Tennessee Democratic Party
 Tennessee Republican Party
 Government of Tennessee
 2020 United States presidential election in Tennessee
 2020 United States House of Representatives elections in Tennessee
2020 Tennessee State Senate election
2020 Tennessee House of Representatives election
 2020 Tennessee elections
 2020 United States Senate elections
 2020 United States elections

Notes

Partisan clients

References

External links
 
 
  (State affiliate of the U.S. League of Women Voters)
 

Official campaign websites
 Marquita Bradshaw (D) for Senate
 Yomi Faparusi (I) for Senate
 Bill Hagerty (R) for Senate
 Elizabeth Macleod (I) for Senate
 Kacey Morgan (I) for Senate 

2020
Tennessee
United States Senate
Open seats in the 2020 United States Senate elections